Radmilo Ivančević (born 4 September 1950) is a Serbian football manager and former footballer.

Coaching career
Ivančević's career began in 1983 as manager of Serbian amateur club Šumadija Aranđelovac, he then moved on to train the Kazma SC in Kuwait in 1984 and remained there until 1988, after which he assumed position as assistant manager of the Kuwait national football team.

Since then, the Serb has worked with Radomir Antić in Spain and trained a number of Serbian and International teams, and a number of teams in Japan, Turkey, Macedonia and Cyprus, ending in with his latest post in Pafos FC from July to October 2014.

Managerial statistics

References

External links
 
 MISL Stats
 

1950 births
Living people
People from Gornji Milanovac
Association football goalkeepers
Serbian footballers
FK Partizan players
Fenerbahçe S.K. footballers
Yugoslav First League players
Süper Lig players
Major Indoor Soccer League (1978–1992) players
Cleveland Force (original MISL) players
Yugoslav expatriate footballers
Expatriate soccer players in the United States
Yugoslav expatriate sportspeople in the United States
Expatriate footballers in Turkey
Serbian football managers
FK Radnički Niš managers
FK Makedonija Gjorče Petrov managers
FK Rad managers
OFK Beograd managers
Sakaryaspor managers
AEK Larnaca FC managers
J1 League managers
Hokkaido Consadole Sapporo managers
AEP Paphos FC managers
Alki Larnaca FC managers
FK Radnički 1923 managers
Pafos FC managers
Expatriate football managers in Turkey
Serbian expatriate sportspeople in Turkey
Expatriate football managers in Cyprus
Serbian expatriate sportspeople in Cyprus
Expatriate football managers in Kuwait
Serbian expatriate sportspeople in Kuwait
Expatriate football managers in Japan
Serbian expatriate sportspeople in Japan
Expatriate football managers in North Macedonia
Serbian expatriate sportspeople in North Macedonia
Kazma SC managers
Kuwait SC managers
Kuwait Premier League managers
Serbian expatriate football managers